Ženski košarkarski klub Celje, also known as ŽKK Cinkarna Celje due to sponsorship reasons, is a Slovenian women's basketball club from Celje.

History

Name changes
1993 — Metka Celje
1993–1996 — Celje
1996–2000 — Ingrad Celje
2000–2011 — Merkur Celje
2011–2017 — Athlete Celje
2017–present — Cinkarna Celje

Honours

Domestic
Slovenian Women's Basketball League
Winners (18): 2000, 2003, 2004, 2005, 2006, 2008, 2009, 2012, 2013, 2014, 2015, 2016, 2017, 2018, 2019, 2020, 2021, 2022
Runners-up (7): 1996, 1998, 2001, 2002, 2007, 2010, 2011

Slovenian Women's Basketball Cup
Winners (17): 2003, 2005, 2006, 2007, 2008, 2009, 2010, 2012, 2013, 2015, 2016, 2017, 2019, 2020, 2021, 2022, 2023
Runners-up (9): 1996, 1998, 1999, 2000, 2001, 2002, 2004, 2011, 2018

International
WABA League
Winners (3): 2002, 2017, 2022
Runners-up: 2018

References

External links
Official website 

Basketball teams established in 1993
Women's basketball teams in Slovenia
1993 establishments in Slovenia